Whitman is a neighborhood in the South Philadelphia section of Philadelphia, Pennsylvania, United States. It is bounded on the west by Sixth Street, on the east by Front Street, on the south by Bigler Street, and on the north by Snyder Avenue. The name "Whitman" was adopted when the nearby Walt Whitman Bridge was being constructed in the 1950s.
In 2015, Whitman and nearby South Philadelphia neighborhoods were named by Philadelphia Magazine as one of the safest and most family-friendly neighborhoods in Philadelphia.

Demographics
According to the 2000 Census, Whitman, combined with Queen Village and Southwark, has 26,300 inhabitants. The racial makeup of the community is White, 60 percent; Black, 27 percent; Asian, 8 percent; Latino, 5 percent. About 40 percent of the population is under 18. Whitman has a very large population of Irish Catholics. The 2010 Census showed progressive changes in demographics, including an increase in total inhabitants, with a marked increase in Asian American and young professional population.

Major landmarks
Whitman Plaza shopping center, Fourth Street and Oregon Avenue.
YPC Shari-Eli synagogue, 728 W Moyamensing Avenue
Preah Buddha Rangsey Temple on the southeast corner of Mifflin Square

The George Sharswood School and SS United States are listed on the National Register of Historic Places.

Playgrounds

Lawrence E. Murphy Recreation Center, 300 W. Shunk St. This 4.9-acre park has playground equipment, a pool, a basketball court, and sports fields. The five-room building has a gymnasium and multi-purpose rooms. The site was renamed in honor of Lawrence E. Murphy in 1964. He was an employee of the recreation department for 37 years. He worked at this site when it was known as "Greenwich Recreation Center."

Mifflin Square, 500 Wolf St. This 4.2-acre park in South Philadelphia has large trees, walkways, playground equipment and a basketball court.

Reverend Edward P. Burke Playground, 200 Snyder Ave. A 1.7-acre site with playground equipment, a basketball court and hockey court. Located adjacent to the Whitman branch of the Free Library. The site was named in honor of Reverend Edward P. Burke in 1963. Burke was pastor at Our Lady of Mount Carmel church from 1950 until his death in 1960. He was a vocal opponent of housing and expressway construction projects that threatened to destroy homes in the area. He was ordained in 1922 and served as a U.S. Army chaplain in WWII, retiring with the rank of major.

Education

Schools
The School District of Philadelphia operates public schools in the Whitman neighborhood.
George Sharswood Elementary, 2300 S. Second St.
John H. Taggart Elementary, 400 Porter St.

Neighborhoods assigned to Sharswood are also assigned to Furness High School.

Public libraries
The Free Library of Philadelphia Whitman Branch serves the community.

Notable residents
Joey Coyle, who stole $1.2 million that fell from an armored truck. His story was developed into a 1993 movie, Money for Nothing, starring John Cusack.
Jim Kenney, the 99th mayor of Philadelphia, grew up in the Whitman neighborhood and once served as a board member of Whitman Council Civic Association.
 Mark Squilla, city councilman.

District and local organization

State Senate district
 First, Nikil Saval (D)

State House district
 184th, Elizabeth Fiedler (D)

City Council district
 First, Mark Squilla (D)

Ward
 39th

Police district
 Third

Civic groups and town watches
 Whitman Plaza Community
 Pennsport/Whitman Town Watch
Mifflin Square Patrol
 Whitman Council, which holds monthly meetings and distributes bimonthly newsletters.

References 

Neighborhoods in Philadelphia
Irish-American neighborhoods
Little Italys in the United States
South Philadelphia